Turkey is a country between Asia and Europe.

Turkey may also refer to:

Birds
 Turkey (bird), the genus Meleagris of large birds native to North America and Central America
 Turkey as food, the meat of the bird

Places
 Turkey, Limpopo, a town in South Africa
 Turkey, North Carolina, a town
 Turkey, Texas, a city
 Turkey Brook, Hertfordshire, England
 Turkey Mountain (Georgia)
 Turkey Mountain (New York)
 Turkey Mountain Urban Wilderness Area, Oklahoma
 Turkey Ponds, two connected ponds in New Hampshire
 Turkey River (Iowa)
 Turkey River (New Hampshire)
 Turkey Run (West Branch Susquehanna River tributary), a river in Pennsylvania

Arts and entertainment
 "The Turkey", a short story by Flannery O'Connor
 The Turkey (film), a 1951 French film
 Turkeys (film) or Free Birds
 Turkey Television, a Canadian teen sketch comedy

Other uses
 Turkey (bowling), a bowling term used to denote three consecutive strikes
 Turkey (nickname)
 Hotel Turkey, a hotel in Turkey, Texas
 USS Turkey (AM-13), a minesweeper laid down in 1917
 USS Turkey (AMS-56), a minesweeper laid down in 1943

People with the name
 Turkey Tayac (1895–1978), American Indian leader and herbal doctor
 Turkey Tolson Tjupurrula (–2001), Australian Indigenous artist

See also

 Australian brushturkey, also called scrub turkey or bush turkey, a species of mound-building bird found in eastern Australia
 Australian bustard or bush turkey, a species of large ground bird in Australia and New Guinea
 Brushturkey, birds native to Oceania
 Little Turkey (1758–1801), a Cherokee leader
 Turke (disambiguation)
 Turkey Creek (disambiguation)
 Turkey Island (disambiguation)
 Turkey moray, an eel found in the Indian and Pacific Oceans
 Turkey vulture or turkey buzzard, a scavenger bird native to the Americas
 Turki (disambiguation)
 Turkiye (disambiguation)
 Turky (disambiguation)